The Little Grassy Creek is a tidal creek in South Andros, the Bahamas.  Little Grassy Creek is a tributary of Grassy Creek.  There are also Grassy Creek Cays.

See also
List of rivers of the Bahamas

References

Rivers of the Bahamas